Human Zoo is a 2009 French drama film directed by Rie Rasmussen.

Cast 
 Rie Rasmussen - Adria Shala
 Nikola Đuričko - Srdjan Vasiljevic
 Nick Corey - Shawn Reagan
 Vojin Ćetković - Alex
 Miloš Timotijević - Boris
 Hiam Abbass - Mina
 Saïd Amadis - Mohamed
 Branislav Lečić - Commander Stojkovic

Production
Rie Rasmussen, director and leading actress, said her sex scenes were unsimulated."This is for real. I wanted to see it for real, and I wanted it to be from a female’s point of view. Yeah, he is going down on her. It’s in one take. There’s no fu*king cutting in and out and making it all romantic and rosey and shit. This is one take, and that’s how it is. It’s clumsy, it’s sexy, it’s hardcore, and he is going down on her," she said.

References

External links 

2009 drama films
2009 films
French drama films
Yugoslav Wars films
Works about the Kosovo War
2000s French films